Donna Troy is a character appearing in DC comicics.

Donna Troy may also refer to:

 "Donna Troy" (Titans episode)
 Donna Troy (Titans character)